Jonathan Foyle is an architectural historian, broadcaster and advocate for heritage sites. He is also an artist.

Background 
Foyle grew up in Market Deeping in Lincolnshire and attended The Deepings School. He has a Master of Arts from the Courtauld Institute of Art where he trained as an architect, and later worked for a year surveying the architectural details and structure of Canterbury Cathedral. He then became Curator of Historic Buildings for Historic Royal Palaces for eight years. During this time Foyle produced a thesis on the early history of Hampton Court and received a doctorate from the University of Reading in 2002. He also has an honorary degree in Conservation and Restoration from the University of Lincoln.

Education 

Honorary degree in Conservation and Restoration (2011) University of Lincoln
Ph.D Archaeology, University of Reading (2002) (Won British Academy Reckitt Prize )
Dipl.Arch (Postgraduate Diploma in Architecture) Canterbury School of Architecture (1995)
M.A.  History of Art 1560–1660 Courtauld Institute of Art, University of London (1993)
B.A. (Hons) 2:1 Architecture Canterbury School of Architecture (1992)
National Diploma in Art and Design Lincoln College of Art (1989)

Career 
Foyle has written many scholarly papers and additionally contributed articles for a number of newspapers and popular magazines.

He is perhaps best known as a passionate communicator on history. He has taught and lectured widely in Britain and around the world and has appeared and presented a number of television broadcasts.

Since 2002, he has presented films for Channel 4, the BBC, the History Channel, ITN, Lion and Discovery Channels. His 2009 series on Henry VIII as art patron garnered praise. In 2010 his television series Climbing Great Buildings captured his largest audience yet. He delights in working without a net, whether by dangling from an immense height in order to comment on the iron tracery of St Pancras railway station or by improvising a pencil sketch of the pyramids' surroundings in Egypt.

In 2007 Foyle accepted the position of Chief Executive of World Monuments Fund Britain, the UK arm of a global charity, which has achieved great success in securing imperiled architectural sites for future generations.

Television

BBC One
 Inside Out (Feb. 2010) Reporter, Gloucestershire’s Pyramids
 The One Show (2009) Reporter on historic architecture

BBC Two
 Climbing Great Buildings (2010) 15-part series, along with champion climber Lucy Creamer
 The People’s Museum (2006) Daytime series Reporter
 History Mysteries (2005) Daytime series Co-presenter
 Meet The Ancestors: The Lost Palace Of Hampton Court (2002) Prime-time series Specialist

BBC Four
 People’s Palaces: The Golden Age Of Civic Architecture (2010) 2 x 1 hour, presenter
 Henry VIII: Patron Or Plunderer? (2009) 2 x 1 hour, presenter

Channel 4

 Time Team Special: Henry VIII's Lost Palaces (2009), specialist contributor
 Time Team Special: The Arcadian Garden (2007), specialist contributor
 Time Team Special: The Royal Palaces: Buckingham Palace (2006), specialist contributor
 Time Team (2003– ), specialist contributor includes Kew Palace, Syon House, Greenwich Palace, Queenborough Castle, Hunstrete House, Chenies Manor

History Channel US
 Lost Worlds: The Pyramids (2008), prime-time series, investigator
 Lost Worlds: The Sphinx (2008), prime-time series, investigator
 Lost Worlds: The Vikings (2007), prime-time series, investigator
 Lost Worlds: Henry VIII (2007), prime-time series, investigator

Five
 County Secrets (2008) 10-part series, presenter

History Channel UK
 Hidden House History (2006) prime-time series, co-presenter

Professional history 
 2007–present chief Executive, World Monuments Fund Britain
 2003–2007 freelance historian, teacher, presenter, consultant
 1996–2003 curator of Historic Buildings, Hampton Court and Kew Palaces, Historic Royal Palaces
 1995–1996 assistant to the Surveyor of the Fabric, Canterbury Cathedral

Publications 
 The Architecture of Canterbury Cathedral Scala (2012)
 ‘Conservation areas in China: the case of the Juanqinzhai in Beijing’ with Henry Tzu-Ng
English Heritage Conservation Bulletin 62 (2009)
 ‘Some examples of external colouration on English brick buildings, c. 1500–1650’
Bulletin du Centre de recherche du château de Versailles ‘Couleurs de l'architecture’(2002)
 'A Reconstruction of Thomas Wolsey's Great Hall at Hampton Court Palace'
Architectural History Vol 45 (2002)  pp. 128–58

Illustrations for:
 ‘Interpretations of the Rebuilding of Canterbury Cathedral, 1174–1186: Archaeological and Historical Evidence’
Journal of the Society of Architectural Historians 1997, Peter Draper

See also
 Climbing Great Buildings
 University of Lincoln

References

External links
 
 
 
 

British broadcasters
Alumni of the University of Lincoln
Living people
Year of birth missing (living people)
Alumni of the University of Reading
Alumni of the Courtauld Institute of Art
People from the Deepings